Bully-les-Mines is a commune in the Pas-de-Calais département in northern France. It forms part of the Lens-Liévin agglomeration community, which encompasses 36 French communes and 250,000 inhabitants. For many years it was a major coal mining center.

History
The name of Bully-les-Mines has frequently had various forms over the centuries : from Bulgi (in 1135), to Bugi (1152), Builli (1157), Bullia (1198), Bully (1270), Boulli (1303), Buylly (1410), Builly-lez-Aix (1486), Builly-lez-Grenay (1511), Builly-en-Gohelle (1569), Bully-en-Gohelle (1709), Bully-Grenay (1750), Bully-en-Gohelle (1782), and finally Bully-les-Mines in 1925.

According to many sources, the name has Gaulish origins. Ricouart proposes that "Bullire" derives from the French "bouillonner," a reference to the source of the river Surgeon in a neighboring commune. The current use of "les mines" indicates the importance of mining to the commune and the region. The train station has maintained the older name of Bully-Grenay, leading to occasional confusion among travelers.

Although the region has been inhabited from prehistory onward, no evidence of prehistoric settlements has yet been found at Bully. The oldest relic so far discovered in the commune is a Celtic bracelet; Bully once belonged to the "Pagus Silvinus" region of the Atrébates. Gallo-Roman discoveries have been numerous within the commune.

During the sixth century, Bully came under the spiritual leadership of the bishop of Cambrai-Arras.

As an integral part of Artois, Bully fell under the domination of the Counts of Flanders from 862 to 1191 before passing with the rest of the region to French control. Governed directly by the French Crown from 1191 to 1237, the town and region remained part of France until 1384, when they submitted to the rule of Burgundy. A brief return to French control between 1477 and 1492 ended in an absorption into Spanish territory, which lasted until the region returned definitively to France with the 1659 Treaty of the Pyrenees.

Misfortunes of Bully
Bully's close proximity to three military strongholds - Arras, Béthune, and Lens - often situated it in the path of war. In 1213 the village was raided; in 1303 it was destroyed completely, even its trees cut down. In 1348 a third of the population fell to the Black Death, which returned four times in the next century, alternating with famines and wars.

In 1537 Bully was sacked by the troops of Louis XII, and similar misfortunes continued until the French took Lens in 1556-1557. By this time Bully was so destitute that the victorious French proved unable to levy a tax on its inhabitants. In 1648, the village billeted troops involved in the Battle of Lens.

From 1709 to 1712, Bully was buffeted by the advances and retreats of armies fighting in the War of the Spanish Succession, a situation aggravated by an epidemic that killed 24 villagers. In 1796, a fire destroyed half the village, an event commemorated by the present-day "Chemin brûlé."

Coal mining

In 1852 the first site explored by the Compagnie des mines de Béthune was near the village of Bully.
The land was poorly wooded, so the company had to bring timber and workers from Cambrai.
Sinking of Mine 1 at Bully  began on 26 March 1852, and the mine came into operation in 1853.
In 1853 7,000 tons of coal were extracted. This rose to 21,000 tons the next year.
The shaft passed through an underground aquifer, for which a pumping machine was needed. Extraction started in February 1859 in a very rugged deposit.

In December 1859 a decree allowed the company to build a railway from Bully to Violaines.
Decrees of 29 August 1863 and 8 March 1865 authorized the Mines de Béthune to extend their railway network to Béthune and Lille.
A limited company named the Compagnie du Chemin de fer de Lille à Béthune et à Bully-Grenay was formed on 11 May 1865 to operate the railway.

In 1865 a more modern engine was installed in Mine 1 with two horizontal cylinders.
In 1868 the Davaine ventilator in Mine 2 was no longer adequate and had to be replaced.
In November 1869 eighteen workers were asphyxiated by fumes from a fire.
Mine 1 was completely renovated in 1876, with a new  engine installed.
Shaft 1bis was added in 1889 and Shaft 1ter in 1911.

The Étoile Sportive de Bully was founded in 1920 by the Company with a sports complex considered the most modern in France. 
There were five football pitches, one with stands for several hundred spectators, dressing rooms with showers, individual lockers for players. 
Members could also practice gymnastics, boxing and athletics.
Mine 1 was closed in 1961, backfilled in 1971 and the headframes destroyed in 1973.
Mine 2 was closed in 1968, backfilled in 1970 and the headframe destroyed in 1974.

Population

Administration

Michel Vancaille, former vice-president of the Conseil Général of the Pas-de-Calais, served as mayor of Bully-les-Mines from 1989 to 2002, when he was replaced by fellow Socialist François Lemaire.

Sights
The bell tower of the Church of Saint-Maclou is inscribed in the French registry of historic sites and monuments.

Personalities
 David Faupala, footballer
 André Strappe, footballer
 Jean-Marie Vanlerenberghe, mayor of Arras and MoDem Senator for the Pas-de-Calais

See also
 Communes of Pas-de-Calais

References

Sources

External links (in French)

 The website of the Town of Bully-les-Mines
 The website of the Lens-Liévin Communaupole
 The website of the Bully-les-Mines Youth Centre
 The website of the Espace François Mitterrand in Bully-les-Mines

Communes of Pas-de-Calais
Artois